The referendum on EU membership took place on 23 June 2016.  Opinion polling for the United Kingdom European Union membership referendum was ongoing in the months between the announcement of a referendum and the referendum polling day. Polls on the general principle of the UK's membership of the European Union were carried out for a number of years prior to the referendum. 
Opinion polls of voters in general tended to show roughly equal proportions in favour of remaining and leaving. Polls of business leaders, scientists, and lawyers showed majorities in favour of remaining. Among non-British citizens in other EU member states, polling suggested that a majority were in favour of the UK remaining in the EU in principle, but that a similarly sized majority believed that if the UK were only able to remain in the EU on renegotiated terms then it should leave.

Analysis

Demographics 
Younger voters tended to support remaining in the EU (but are generally less likely to vote) whereas older people tended to support leaving. There was no significant difference in attitudes between the genders. According to two out of three pollsters, managerial, professional and administrative workers were most likely to favour staying in the EU, while semi-skilled and unskilled workers, plus those reliant on benefits, were the largest demographic supporting leave. University graduates are generally more likely to vote remain compared to those with no qualifications. White voters were evenly split, and all ethnic minority groups leant towards backing Remain, but registration is lower and turnout can be up to 25% lower in this demographic. Support for remaining in the EU was known to be significantly higher in Scotland than it is in the United Kingdom as a whole.

Polling methods 
The way voters are polled is known to affect the outcome. Telephone polls have consistently found more support for remaining in the EU than online polls. YouGov, which uses online polling, has criticised telephone polls because they "have too high a percentage of graduates", skewing the results. Ipsos MORI and ComRes, and Peter Kellner, the former president of YouGov, have said telephone polls are more reliable. ICM has said "as good a guess as any is that the right answer lies somewhere in between". A joint study by Populus and Number Cruncher Politics in March 2016 concluded that telephone polls were likely to better reflect the state of public opinion on the issue.

The results of the Referendum, as with the results of the 2015 General Election, show that there is still a problem with the polling methodology. Overall, however, online polls seem to have had a better performance than phone polls. Online surveys, on average, predicted a "leave" win with a 1.2% margin, whereas those with a phone methodology had "remain" win with a 2.6% margin. All in all, 63% of online polls predicted a Leave victory, while 78% of phone polls predicted that Remain would win. Kantar TNS and Opinium, both pollsters with online methodologies, were the two groups that forecast a Leave victory just ahead of the vote.

Polls of polls 
Several different groups have calculated polls of polls, which collect and average the results of opinion polls across different companies. They have different methodologies; for example, some give more weight to recent polls than others, some deal with undecided voters differently, and some attempt to adjust for the consistent gap between telephone and online polling. As a result, the polls of polls give a spread of results.

Standard polling on EU membership 

The tables show polling on whether the UK should be in or out of the EU. Polling generally weights the sample to be nationally representative. Polls were usually conducted within Great Britain, with Northern Ireland and Gibraltar normally omitted from the sample. This has historically been the case in British opinion polling because Northern Ireland has a different set of political parties from the rest of the UK, reflecting the political divide between unionism and nationalism or republicanism. Similarly, Gibraltar was not included in standard polls because it has its own local legislature and does not take part in British parliamentary elections, although Gibraltar does take part in elections to the European Parliament and took part in the referendum.

Most of the polls shown here were carried out by members of the British Polling Council (BPC) who fully disclose their findings, methodology and the client who commissioned the poll. As non-members, Qriously (Qriously has since become a member), Greenberg Quinlan Rosner Research, Pew Research Center and Lord Ashcroft Polls are not bound by the standards of the BPC, and their polls should be treated with caution.

The percentages who "would not vote" or who refused to answer are not shown below, although some pollsters have excluded these in any case.

2016

2015

2014

2013

2012

2011

2010

Sub-national polling

England

England and Wales

London

Scotland

Wales

Northern Ireland

Gibraltar

Renegotiated terms 

The UK government renegotiated certain terms of the UK's membership of the European Union before the referendum was held. Prior to the renegotiation in February 2016, some opinion polls asked the referendum question on the assumption that the UK government would say that it was satisfied with the outcome of the renegotiation.

Polling within professional groups

Business leaders 
The British Chambers of Commerce surveyed 2,200 business leaders in January and February 2016. Of these, 60% supported remaining in the EU and 30% supported exit. In a further poll published in May, these numbers had changed to 54% and 37%, respectively.

The Confederation of British Industry reported a survey of 773 of its members, carried out by ComRes. With numbers adjusted to reflect CBI membership, the poll indicated that 80% of CBI members saw a "remain" outcome as the best outcome for their business, with 5% seeing "leave" as the best outcome.

In a poll of 350 board directors of UK businesses, published in June 2015, 82% agreed with the statement that "the UK's membership of the EU is good for British businesses", while 12% disagreed. In a follow-up poll reported in March 2016, 63% agreed that "British businesses are better off inside the European Union than out of it" while 20% disagreed. To the statement, "An EU exit risks stifling British business growth", 59% agreed and 30% disagreed. To the statement, "Our membership of the EU gives British businesses invaluable access to European markets", 71% agreed and 16% disagreed. To the statement "An EU exit would leave British businesses facing a skills shortage", 35% agreed and 50% disagreed.

The manufacturers' organisation EEF used the market research organisation GfK to conduct a survey in late 2015 of 500 senior decision-makers in manufacturing organisations. Of these, 63% wanted the UK to stay in the EU, and 5% wanted it to leave. Three percent said there was no advantage to their businesses for the UK to be in the EU, against 50% who said it was important and a further 20% who said it was critical for their business.

Two surveys by consultants Deloitte asked 120 Chief Financial Officers of large UK companies "whether it is in the interests of UK businesses for the UK to remain a member of the EU". In the first survey, conducted in the final quarter of 2015, 62% agreed while 6% disagreed. A further 28% said they would withhold their judgement until the renegotiation in February 2016. The second survey, conducted in early 2016, had 75% saying it was in the interest of UK businesses to remain, with 8% saying it was not.

In April 2016, the International Chamber of Commerce published a survey of 226 businesses from 27 different countries. Of these international businesses, 46% said they would reduce investment in the UK if it left the EU, while 1% said Brexit would increase their investment in the UK. As to whether the UK should leave the EU, 8% thought it should, while 86% wanted the UK to remain.

In May 2016, law firm King & Wood Mallesons published a survey of 300 businesses, equally split between France, Spain, Italy, and Germany. Asked about the prospect of the UK leaving the EU, 68% said it would adversely affect their businesses and 62% said they would be less likely to do business in the UK. When asked to name ways in which their businesses could benefit from Brexit, a majority of respondents in France, Italy, and Spain said that their countries could benefit as companies move jobs out of the UK.

Scientists 
In March 2016, Nature reported a survey of 907 active science researchers based in the UK. Of these, 78% said exit from the EU would be "somewhat harmful" or "very harmful" for UK science, with 9% saying it would be "somewhat beneficial" or "very beneficial". Asked, "Should the UK exit the EU or remain?", 83% chose "remain" and 12% "exit". The journal also surveyed a further 954 scientists based in the EU but outside the UK. Of these, 47% said the UK's exit would be "harmful" or "very harmful" for science in the EU, with 11.5% choosing "beneficial" or "very beneficial".

Lawyers 
Legal Week surveyed almost 350 partners in legal firms. Of these, 77% said that a UK exit from the EU would have a "negative" or "very negative" effect on the City's position in global financial markets, with 6.2% predicting a "positive" effect. Asked about the effect on their own firms, 59% of the partners predicted a "quite adverse" or "very adverse" effect, while 13% said the effect would be "quite positive" or "very positive".

Economists 
The Financial Times surveyed 105 economists about how an exit from the EU would affect their views of the UK's prospects, publishing the results in January 2016. In the medium term, 76 respondents (72%) said the UK's prospects would be worse, 8 (7.6%) said they would be better, and 18 (17%) predicted no difference.

Ipsos MORI surveyed members of the Royal Economic Society and the Society of Business Economists for The Observer, with 639 responses. Over the next five years, 88% said that Brexit would have a negative effect on GDP, 7% said it would have no impact, and 3% said there would it would have a positive impact, while 82% said it would have a negative effect on household incomes, 9% said it would have no impact, and 7% said it would have a positive effect. Over ten to twenty years, 72% said it would have a negative effect on GDP, 11% said it would have no impact and 11% said it would have a positive effect, while 73% said it would have a negative effect on household income, 13% said it would have no impact, and 10% said it would have a positive effect.

Other opinion polling 

In a poll released in December 2015, Lord Ashcroft asked 20,000 people in the UK to place themselves on a scale of 0–100 of how likely they were vote to remain or leave. A total of 47% placed themselves in the "leave" end of the scale, 38% in the "remain" end and 14% were completely undecided.

On British withdrawal 
 – A poll conducted by French daily newspaper Le Parisien in January 2013 found that 52% of French voters were in favour of the UK withdrawing from the EU. Of the 1,136 people polled, in conjunction with French research agency BVA in January 2013, 48% said they would rather the UK remained inside the EU.
 – A study carried out by Internationale Politik in January 2013 found 64% of Germans favoured the UK remaining inside the EU – with 36% saying they favoured an exit. The biggest support for retaining the union with the UK was with the younger generation with 69% of 18- to 25-year-olds saying they wanted the UK to stay. Amongst the German political parties, the supporters of the Green Party remained most favourable at 85%.

Ashcroft polling 
In early 2016, Lord Ashcroft polled individuals in each of the other European Union member states to gauge opinion on whether they thought the United Kingdom should leave the EU, whether they thought the UK should remain a member or whether they believed it did not matter. All member states said that they wanted the UK to remain a member, except Cyprus, the Czech Republic and Slovenia, with Lithuania being most in favour, at 78% of respondents being for the UK to remain in the EU.

Additionally, Ashcroft asked the same group of people whether they would be happy for the UK to remain in the European Union to renegotiated terms or whether they thought the UK should leave if they do not like their current terms of membership. Newer countries to the European Union, countries which have joined the Union since 2004, were the biggest supporters: 52% supported the renegotiated position, compared to just 40% of respondents from EU members who joined before 2004.

ICM polling 
An ICM online poll of 1,000 adults in each of nine European countries (including Norway, not an EU member state) in November 2015 found an average of 53% in favour of the UK's remaining in the EU.

Post-referendum polling

See also 
 Opinion polling for the next United Kingdom general election

References

External links 
 Post-referendum Brexit polls (most recent) Poll of Polls
 Brexit poll tracker Financial Times
 EU referendum poll tracker BBC News
 EU referendum poll tracker and odds The Telegraph
 EU referendum poll of polls What UK Thinks: EU
 The EU and Brexit Britain Elects

United Kingdom
European Union membership referendum
2016 United Kingdom European Union membership referendum
Opinion polling for United Kingdom votes in the 2010s